Timothy Leo Cullen (born February 16, 1942) is a former infielder in Major League Baseball who played for the Washington Senators (1966–67, 1968–71), Chicago White Sox (1968) and Oakland Athletics (1972). He batted and threw right-handed.

In a six-season career, Cullen was a .220 hitter with nine home runs and 134 RBI in 700 games.

Early life 
A star baseball and basketball player at Junípero Serra High School in San Mateo, California, Cullen was selected an All-CAL infielder twice and an All-CAL guard as a senior. Later, he was a two-sport star at Santa Clara University and played in the College World Series.

Professional career 
Originally signed by the Boston Red Sox as an amateur free agent in 1964, Cullen debuted with the Senators in 1966.  A Topps Rookie All-Star in his inaugural season, he appeared in the 1972 World Series with Oakland. Like Gonzalo Márquez, Cullen was a valuable utility for the World Championship team providing support from the bench during the regular season.

In his career, Cullen was a competent infielder with good instincts and an avid student of the game; but he struggled as a batter. Even when he hit in the low .200s, Cullen's glove was enough to get him a considerable playing time. He was an above-average major league second baseman and an adequate shortstop and third baseman as well. Nevertheless, a rare feat earned him a place in baseball's record book.

In February 1968, Cullen was sent to the White Sox a deal for, among others, shortstop Ron Hansen. In a curious movement, he was then shipped back mid-season to Washington for Hansen, making them the only two players in MLB history to be traded for one another twice in the same season.

Personal life 
Currently a resident of Fresno, California, Cullen serves as the vice president of special projects for the Triple-A Fresno Grizzlies, a SF Giants minor league affiliate team.

External links

The 1972 Oakland A's
Junípero Serra Athletic Hall of Fame

1942 births
Living people
Baseball players from San Francisco
Basketball players from California
Chicago White Sox players
Hawaii Islanders players
Iowa Oaks players
Major League Baseball second basemen
Minor league baseball executives
Oakland Athletics players
Santa Clara Broncos baseball players
Santa Clara Broncos men's basketball players
Seattle Rainiers players
Washington Senators (1961–1971) players
Junípero Serra High School (San Mateo, California) alumni